Events from the year 1989 in Sweden.

Incumbents
 Monarch – Carl XVI Gustaf
 Prime Minister – Ingvar Carlsson

Events
1 October – Establishment of the Swedish Security Service

Popular culture

Film
6 March – The 24th Guldbagge Awards were presented.
15 September – The Women on the Roof released

Sport
17 to 20 August – The 1989 World Orienteering Championships were held in Skövde.
23 September to 1 October – The 1989 Men's European Volleyball Championship was hosted in Örebro and Stockholm.

Births

22 February – Anna Sundstrand, singer and model
28 March – Jenny Lönnkvist, orienteering competitor
10 April – Jenny Alm, handball player
27 April – Jerker Lysell, orienteering competitor, world champion in sprint (2016)
5 May – Agnes Knochenhauer, curler
23 May – Jeffery Taylor, basketball player
12 June – Emma Eliasson, ice hockey player, Olympic silver medalist
29 June – Jens Westin, ice hockey player
11 July – Tobias Sana, football player
21 July – Christoffer Sundgren, curler
8 September – Avicii, DJ, remixer, record producer, musician and songwriter
24 October – Felix Arvid Ulf Kjellberg, a.k.a. PewDiePie, YouTube personality
4 November – Frida Svedin Thunström, ice hockey player

Deaths

1 February – Erik Persson, footballer (born 1909)
27 February – Göran Larsson, swimmer (born 1932)
16 June – Arthur Häggblad, cross-country skier (born 1908)
20 September – Stig Andersson-Tvilling, ice hockey player (born 1928)
29 October – Anders Rydberg, football player (born 1903)
23 December – Lennart Strandberg, athlete (born 1915)
31 December – Clarence Hammar, sailor (born 1899)

References

 
Sweden
Years of the 20th century in Sweden